Violent New Breed is the third and final album by Swedish rock band Shotgun Messiah, released in 1993 on Relativity Records. Breaking from their previous albums, Violent New Breed featured a more industrial rock sound.

Track listing
 All songs written by Shotgun Messiah

"I'm a Gun" - 3:29
"Come Down" - 3:12
"Violent New Breed" - 4:57
"Enemy in Me" - 4:05
"Revolution" - 3:38
"Monkey Needs" - 3:22
"Rain" - 3:46
"Jihad" - 3:53
"Side F/X" - 2:08
"Sex" - 4:17
"Overkill" - 3:14
"I Come in Peace" - 3:43

Personnel
Tim Skold - vocals, bass, programming
Harry K. Cody - guitars, programming
Ulf "Cybersank" Sandquist - programming

Produced, Arranged and Performed by Ulf "Cybersank" Sandquist and Shotgun Messiah (Harry Cody & Tim Skold.)

Recorded at Atlantis Studios, Stockholm.

Mixed by Stefan Glaumann at M.V.G. Studios, Stockholm.

Cover by Michael Lucero (?UC-Is-?U-Get) and Shotgun Messiah.

References

1993 albums
Shotgun Messiah albums